Experimental Psychology is a quarterly peer-reviewed scientific journal covering research on experimental psychology. It was established in 1953 as Zeitschrift für Experimentelle und Angewandte Psychologie, and was renamed Zeitschrift fur Experimentelle Psychologie in 1995. In 2001, it was renamed to its current name. It is published by Hogrefe Publishing Group and the editor-in-chief is Christoph Stahl (University of Cologne). According to the Journal Citation Reports, the journal has a 2016 impact factor of 1.829.

References

External links

Experimental psychology journals
Publications established in 1953
Quarterly journals
Hogrefe Publishing academic journals
English-language journals